Aleksey Vyacheslavovych Karyakin (Russian: Алексе́й Вячесла́вович Каря́кин), born 7 April 1980 in Stakhanov is a former Chairman of the People's Council (parliament) of the unrecognized state of Luhansk People's Republic. He was voted out on 25 March 2016.

In media appeared information that Karyakin is imprisoned by Luhansk People's Republic. Couple of days later, in interview to Kommersant he denied those claims. He is suspected of attempted murder "of law enforcement officers and military personnel", "international damage to another's property" and "illegal purchase, storage, transportation or carrying of firearms and ammunition".

Karyakin was born in Stakhanov in the Luhansk region of the Ukrainian SSR. After graduating from college with a degree in motor vehicle maintenance and repair, he had a small business.

On May 18, 2014 Karyakin was elected head of parliament of the unrecognized state of Luhansk People's Republic.

References

1980 births
Living people
People from Stakhanov, Ukraine
People of the Luhansk People's Republic
Pro-Russian people of the 2014 pro-Russian unrest in Ukraine
Pro-Russian people of the war in Donbas
Ukrainian prisoners and detainees
Ukrainian collaborators with Russia